Daurai railway station is a railway station in Ajmer district, Rajasthan. Its code is DOZ. It serves Daurai of Ajmer. The station consists of a single platform. Passenger, Superfast trains halt here.

Major trains

The following trains start from Daurai railway station:

 New Delhi–Daurai Shatabdi Express

References

Railway stations in Ajmer district
Ajmer railway division